Dimocarpus confinis is now considered a subspecies of the plant Dimocarpus fumatus (subsp. indochinensis).  The species ranges from southern China (Guangdong, Guangxi, Guizhou, Hunan, Yunnan provinces) and Indo-China. It produces oval-shaped drupe fruits, but are mainly grown as ornamental plants and not as a food source.

References

External links
 Dimocarpus confinis info

confinis
Flora of Indo-China